The brown-backed flowerpecker (Dicaeum everetti) is a species of bird in the family Dicaeidae.  The scientific name commemorates British colonial administrator and zoological collector Alfred Hart Everett.

Distribution and habitat
It is found in Brunei, Indonesia, and Malaysia.  Its natural habitats are subtropical or tropical moist lowland forest and subtropical or tropical mangrove forest.
It is threatened by habitat loss.

References

Dicaeum
Birds described in 1877
Taxonomy articles created by Polbot